is a Japanese manga series by Sakurako Gokurakuin. The manga was serialized in Square Enix's seinen magazine Young Gangan between December 2004 and August 2015. A sequel to the manga began serialization in the same magazine in May 2017. An anime adaptation produced by Seven Arcs and directed by Keizō Kusakawa aired in Japan between July and September 2008, and a second season aired between July and September 2010. Both seasons were licensed in North America by Funimation, until their license expired in 2017. The central character of the series is Minato Sahashi, a ronin who has failed his college entrance examinations two years in a row. His life changes, however, when he meets several girls with special powers called "Sekirei" and is dragged into a battle to possibly decide the fate of the world.

Plot

The same day of his second failure, Minato meets a girl named Musubi, who literally falls out of the sky on top of him. Minato soon learns that she is a "Sekirei", and she chooses him as her "Ashikabi", one of the mysterious set of humans that have the genetic trait and can make a contract by kissing the Sekirei; this binds the Sekirei to the Ashikabi and allows them to use their full power in elimination battles with other Sekirei. Made up of 108 cute girls, attractive buxom women and bishōnen, the Sekirei battle in a competition known as the "Sekirei Plan" organized by Hiroto Minaka, the chairman and founder of the mysterious and powerful MBI Corporation.

Minato quickly learns that being the partner of a Sekirei is not all fun and games, especially when five other Sekirei choose him as their Ashikabi, each also forming a contract/bond with him. Now Minato must find a way to survive both the life-threatening battles of the Sekirei Plan and his partners' fierce competition for him.

Terminology

Sekirei
 are superpowered beings with a different genetic code that may react to a human's, and who have been "modified" to be able to exist on Earth. On board, the pair had found 108 life-forms, described as "One pillar and 107 baby birds".
 The first of them (a pillar, shown as #00, later renumbered and known as #01 Miya) was an adult.
 Eight (later known as #02–09) were embryos, also known as the "Single Numbers".
 99 others (later known as #10–108) were fertilized eggs.
The adult and the eight embryos are also known as the "Single Numbers". It is hinted that unwinged Single Numbers are equal or even more powerful than their winged counterparts. All of the Sekirei had been given adjustments for the Sekirei Plan, especially the Single Numbers. The adjustments had been used not only for enabling them to exist on Earth but also for making them stronger and for controlling and strengthening their power. In order to use the Norito, a Sekirei must engage in mucosal contact with (i.e.,  be kissed by) their Ashikabi prior to reciting it. Sekirei that are under the same Ashikabi can also merge their powers/techniques in order to create more powerful techniques; this puts most Ashikabi at a disadvantage, as only a few Ashikabi possess more than one Sekirei.

Ashikabi
 are humans with unique DNA that enable them to empower the Sekirei destined to serve them. Through mucosal contact (kissing) between a Sekirei and its Ashikabi, a Sekirei without wings can become a "winged" or "emerged" Sekirei. Unlike Sekirei, who are mostly buxom women or handsome young men, Ashikabi can be quite innocuous as they can appear in any gender, age and even status. In the series, the power of an Ashikabi can be determined not only by the number of Sekirei he or she has in his or her disposal, but by the bond between them. As the Sekirei battle escalates, five Ashikabi in particular, emerged as the favorites to win the Sekirei Fight, each having winged at least three Sekirei. One of them is Natsuo Ichinomi, an employee of MBI who is also the leader of the Disciplinary Squad, while each one of the other four controls a different area in the city; Minato Sahashi in the North, Hayato Mikogami in the South, Izumi Higa in the East and Nishi Sanada in the West. If an Ashikabi dies or is killed, all Sekirei winged by him or her will also perish.

Jinki
, are eight mysterious artifacts numbered from #1 to #8, also found on the Sekirei spaceship. If all eight of them are gathered, it is possible that they can be used to terminate all Sekirei if the wielder desires. Upon all Sekirei being winged, Minaka puts all Jinki in MBI's possession as prizes for the matches of the Third Stage, and only the Ashikabi with a Jinki are allowed to keep participating in the Sekirei Battle by the end of the stage.

Sekirei Plan
The , known to Minaka and others as the "Game", is a competition in which the Sekirei and their Ashikabi must fight for survival until the last one of each remains. The true purpose of the plan is unknown, but it is implied to be sinister to some extent. The second anime season ended with the Second Stage completed, but before the Third Stage matches begin.
First Stage: The Sekirei are adjusted and released in Tokyo. Thereafter, they must find Ashikabi in order to be winged. This stage ends when 90% of the Sekirei have been winged.
Second Stage: Teito becomes a closed city and no Sekirei or Ashikabi can leave. The Ashikabi must then wing the remaining unwinged Sekirei, and every Ashikabi and their Sekirei must defeat at least one Sekirei.
Third Stage: A series of battle royales between Ashikabi for possession of the Jinki. Only the Ashikabi who secure at least one of the Jinki until the end of this stage are eligible to advance.
Final stage: The remaining Ashikabi are brought with their Sekirei to Kamikura Island and must fight among each other for the right to ascend to the Heavenly Palace Kouten and fight the pillar for the prize awaiting the ultimate winner of the Sekirei Battle.

Media

Manga

Sekirei is a manga series written and illustrated by Sakurako Gokurakuin. It was serialized in Square Enix's seinen manga magazine Young Gangan between December 3, 2004 and August 21, 2015. Square Enix published 18 tankōbon volumes between June 25, 2005 and October 24, 2015. A sequel to the manga titled  began serialization in Young Gangan on May 2, 2017. Yen Press licensed the original series in North America and began releasing the series with the first volume digitally in November 2015. They later began releasing the series in print in omnibus volumes combining two volumes into one in July 2017.

Drama CD
A drama CD entitled Sekirei Original Drama CD was released on July 25, 2007 by Frontier Works.

Anime

The first 12-episode anime series adaptation produced by the animation studio Seven Arcs and directed by Keizō Kusakawa aired in Japan between July 2 and September 17, 2008. The anime is licensed by Aniplex in Japan. The first season is mostly faithful to the overall story structure of the manga series, covering roughly the first fifty-one chapters of the series. Six DVDs of the first season were released between October 22, 2008 and March 25, 2009. The sixth DVD volume was supplemented with an original video animation (OVA) episode, featuring Kusano participating in the shopping race with Musubi and Tsukiumi. A Blu-ray box set of the first season was released on June 30, 2010 with three Blu-ray discs and one additional CD. At Anime USA 2009, Funimation announced that the anime's first season was licensed and a DVD box set was released on November 23, 2010.

A second season entitled  began airing on July 4, 2010 on Tokyo MX and on July 6, 2010 on some other Japanese networks. The first episode of Sekirei: Pure Engagement was pre-aired on June 13, 2010. A single containing both songs was released on July 21, 2010. The limited edition of the single came bundled with a special three-minute OVA, classified as episode 0, titled . The full 28-minute version of the OVA was released with the first BD/DVD volume of the second season on August 25, 2010. As with the first season, Pure Engagement is licensed in North America by Funimation, and released the series on January 3, 2012. Funimation's licenses for both seasons expired on February 9, 2017. Manga Entertainment released Pure Engagement in the United Kingdom on November 19, 2012.

Video game

A video game for PlayStation 2 entitled  was released on October 29, 2009 by Alchemist in limited and regular editions. The limited edition version was bundled with figures of Musubi and Tsukiumi with Kusano in a panda suit, a 40-minute drama CD, and an illustration of Matsu. While Musubi, Tsukiumi, Matsu, Kusano, Miya, Homura, Uzume and Minato reprise their roles from the anime and manga, four new characters were created by Alchemist consisting of two Sekirei, one Ashikabi and a baby as video game-only characters.

The game takes place in the Sekirei timeline, being played as a visual novel. The plot centers around the discovery of said baby, who is being pursued by unknown persons after Minato and the Sekirei find her abandoned in the city.

Reception
Volume eight of the Sekirei manga made the top 30 manga sold in Japan, holding third place with 103,811 copies sold from February 24 to March 2, 2009. Volume nine placed 17th out of 30 with 65,732 copies sold from December 21–27, 2009. From June 28 to July 4, 2010, volume ten sold 47,019 copies for a total amount of 120,991 in 20th out of 30.

References

External links
 Manga official website  
 Anime official website 
 Video game official website 
 

Aniplex
Extraterrestrials in anime and manga
Harem anime and manga
Fiction set in 2020
Funimation
Gangan Comics manga
Romantic comedy anime and manga
Seinen manga
Seven Arcs
Square Enix franchises
Science fantasy anime and manga
Yen Press titles